The 1st constituency of Essonne is a French legislative constituency in the Essonne département.

Description

The 1st constituency of Essonne has changed radically since it was first created. Its latest incarnation is a densely packed urban seat including the towns of Corbeil-Essonnes and Évry both of which form part of the sprawl of suburbs along the A6 motorway heading south from Paris.

Politically the seat has been rock solid for the left since the early 1970s. The constituency was represented by Prime Minister of France Manuel Valls for ten years between 2002 and 2012. He was replaced upon his appointment to the government of Jean-Marc Ayrault by Carlos Da Silva. In the 2017 legislative elections Valls was again elected as the representative.

Deputies

Election results

2022

 
 
 
 
 
 
 
|-
| colspan="8" bgcolor="#E9E9E9"|
|-

2018 by-election 

On October 3, 2018, Manuel Valls resigns as deputy and announces his candidacy for the municipal elections of 2019 in Barcelona.
By-election will be held on November 18 and November 25, 2018.

2017 

 
 
 
 
 
 
 
 
 
|-
| colspan="8" bgcolor="#E9E9E9"|
|-

2012 

 
 
 
 
 
 
|-
| colspan="8" bgcolor="#E9E9E9"|
|-

2007

 
 
 
 
 
 
 
 
|-
| colspan="8" bgcolor="#E9E9E9"|
|-

2002

 
 
 
 
 
|-
| colspan="8" bgcolor="#E9E9E9"|
|-

1997

 
 
 
 
 
 
 
 
|-
| colspan="8" bgcolor="#E9E9E9"|
|-

Sources

Official results of French elections from 2002: "Résultats électoraux officiels en France" (in French).

1